Aluma ( or , lit. Sheaf) is a moshav in southern Israel. Located in the southern coastal plain around three kilometers north-west of Kiryat Gat, it falls under the jurisdiction of Shafir Regional Council.

History

The village was established in 1965 as a youth village named Hazon Yehezkel by a group called Mosadot Hinukh Ezuri (lit. Institute for Regional Education), made up of young members of Agudat Yisrael. It was built on the ruins of the depopulated Palestinian village of Hatta. In 1996 the Ministry of Interior granted the village municipal council status and renamed it Aluma.
In 2014, the Israel Antiquities Authority uncovered a Byzantine-era church with a magnificent mosaic floor. The church was discovered during a salvage dig prior to the construction of a new neighborhood on the moshav.

References

Community settlements
Populated places established in 1965
Religious Israeli communities
Populated places in Southern District (Israel)